Axel Johnson Ranch, on Sorum Road about  east of South Dakota Highway 79, about  south of Reva, South Dakota, was listed on the National Register of Historic Places in 1987.  The listing included five contributing buildings and two contributing structures.

The ranch house is formed of four homestead shacks which were moved together in the 1910s.  A gable-on-hip barn built in 1923 is of the greatest historic interest;  it is "one of the few traditional Norwegian barns to have survived in Harding County to the present time."

References

National Register of Historic Places in South Dakota
Buildings and structures completed in 1919
Harding County, South Dakota